Smithville Independent School District is a public school district based in Smithville, Texas (USA).

Located in Bastrop County, in which it serves Smithville and Rosanky, a small portion of the district extends into Fayette County.

In 2009, the school district was rated "academically acceptable" by the Texas Education Agency.

Smithville ISD is in the service area of Austin Community College.

Schools
In the 2012–2013 school year, the district had students in five schools.
Smithville High School (Grades 9-12)
Smithville Junior High School (Grades 6-8)
Smithville Elementary School (Grades (3-5)
Brown Primary School (Grades EE-2)
Bastrop County Juvenile Boot Camp (Grades 4-12)

References

External links
Smithville ISD

School districts in Bastrop County, Texas
School districts in Fayette County, Texas